Einstødingen Island is a lone island lying  east of Padda Island in southern Lutzow-Holm Bay. It was mapped by Norwegian cartographers from air photos taken by the Lars Christensen Expedition, 1936–37, and named "Einstødingen" (the hermit) because of its isolated position.

See also 
 List of antarctic and sub-antarctic islands

References 

Islands of Queen Maud Land
Prince Harald Coast